Mary Troby was an English silversmith.

Troby was the widow of silversmith John Troby. She registered her mark on 17 December 1804 and remained active until around 1808. Classed as a smallworker, she lived at 2 Ship Court, Old Bailey. With her husband she had three children including William Troby, also active as a silversmith.

A George III centerpiece by Troby, dating to 1808, is in the collection of the National Museum of Women in the Arts.

References

English silversmiths
Women silversmiths
English women artists
19th-century English artists
19th-century British women artists
Artists from London
19th-century English women